Giannetto is a name. Notable people with the name include:

 Giannetto, a character in the Italian opera La gazza ladra
Giannetto De Rossi (1942–2021), Italian makeup and special effects artist
Giannetto Termanini, Italian Olympic gymnast
Giannetto Valli (1869–1927), Italian politician
Randal Giannetto (born 1956), American politician